Malinowski (feminine: Malinowska; plural: Malinowscy) is a surname of Polish-language origin. It is related to the following surnames:

People 
Agnieszka Malinowska, Polish mathematician
 (born 1954), Polish Army general
 (born 1947), Polish politician
Bronisław Malinowski (1884–1942), Polish-British anthropologist
Bronisław Malinowski (athlete) (1951–1981), Polish athlete
Donald Malinowski (politician) (1924–2003), Canadian Catholic priest and politician
Donald Malinowski (soccer), American soccer goalkeeper
Ernest Malinowski (1818–1899), Polish engineer
Franciszek Malinowski (disambiguation), multiple people
Jay Malinowski (born 1982), Canadian vocalist and guitarist
Kady Malinowski (born 1996), Polish-Brazilian footballer
Lucjan Malinowski (1839–1898), Polish linguist
Ludwik Malinowski (1887–1962), Polish Resistance fighter
Marcin Malinowski (born 1975), Polish footballer
Merlin Malinowski (born 1958), Canadian hockey player
Piotr Malinowski (born 1984), Polish footballer
Roman Malinowski (1935–2021), Polish politician
Stan Malinowski (born 1936), American fashion photographer
Stephen Malinowski (born 1953), American musician and software engineer
Tadeusz Czesław Malinowski (1932-2018), Polish archaeologist and scientist
Tom Malinowski (born 1965), American politician
Wiktor Malinowski (born 1994), Polish poker player

See also
 
 
Władysław Pobóg-Malinowski (1899–1962), Polish soldier, historian and journalist

Polish-language surnames